Joseph Dominic Spottiswood (16 March 1893 – 7 May 1960) was an English professional footballer who made over 150 appearances in the Football League for Swansea Town. An outside left, he also played for Manchester City, Bury, Chelsea and Queens Park Rangers.

Personal life
Spottiswood's brother Bob was also a footballer. He served as a private in the Manchester Regiment during the First World War.

Honours 
Swansea Town

 Football League Third Division South: 1924–25

Career statistics

References

1893 births
1960 deaths
English footballers
Manchester City F.C. players
Bury F.C. players
Chelsea F.C. players
Swansea City A.F.C. players
Queens Park Rangers F.C. players
English Football League players
Footballers from Carlisle, Cumbria
Association football outside forwards
Carlisle United F.C. players
British Army personnel of World War I
Manchester Regiment soldiers